Matthew Joseph Cohen (born September 28, 1982) is an American actor and filmmaker best known for playing young John Winchester and the archangel Michael in Supernatural, Aiden Dennison on the teen drama series South of Nowhere, and as Griffin Munro on the ABC daytime soap General Hospital. In 2019, he became a correspondent for Entertainment Tonight.

Early life
Cohen was born in Miami, Florida. He is Jewish. Cohen played football and ran track in high school. He attended American Heritage School from 2nd to 12th grade and graduated in 2001. Cohen competed in auto racing and motocross. He graduated with honors. Cohen went to Florida State where he studied business. While in college, he enrolled in acting classes. After finishing college, Cohen moved to Los Angeles to pursue acting.

Career

Cohen has starred in several films such as Boogeyman 2, Dark House and he played lead character Aiden Dennison on The N's South of Nowhere. He played Syd on Rockville CA, a WB web series created by The O.Cs Josh Schwartz. In 2009, he co-produced The Outside, which starred Nia Peeples, Michael Graziadei, Dante Basco and South of Nowhere'''s Rob Moran. In late 2008, he had a guest-starring role in the third episode of The CW's fourth season of Supernatural as a young John Winchester, which he later reprised in the fifth-season episode "The Song Remains the Same". He reappeared in the eleventh season's "Baby," but was revealed to be an unknown being posing as John Winchester to communicate with Sam in his dreams. This being was later identified as Lucifer. He portrayed Johnny Jones in the slasher–thriller film Chain Letter. He guest-starred in the fourth season of 90210 as Jeremy, after replacing Drew Seeley in the role. It was announced on August 11, 2015, that Cohen was to recur in the second season of How to Get Away with Murder as Levi, who is described as a sexy, edgy, working-class guy. He will first appear in the second episode and will appear in a total of three episodes. In 2016, he joined the cast of General Hospital as Griffin Munro. In March 2019, it was announced that Cohen would leave General Hospital, making his last appearance on March 22, 2019. In December 2019, it was announced that Cohen would return to General Hospital for a short period of time; he returned from December 6–10, 2019.

As of February 2020, Cohen is a director on Days of Our Lives.

Personal life
Cohen married his South of Nowhere'' co-star Mandy Musgrave on May 18, 2011. Mandy gave birth to their son, Macklin, in April 2015.

Filmography

Film

Television

Other work

References

External links
 
 
 

1982 births
Living people
Male actors from Miami
American male film actors
American male television actors
Florida State University alumni